Ron Cohen is an American television composer and soundtrack writer. He graduated from the California State University, in Northridge.

Positions held
 Composer on Leeza and The Guiding Light.
 Music writer on Go Tigers!
 Sound track on Rat Race

Awards and nominations
Cohen has been nominated for five Daytime Emmy awards and won twice, in the categories Outstanding Music Direction and Composition for a Drama Series, and Outstanding Achievement in Musical Direction and Composition for a Drama series, for his work on The Guiding Light. He was nominated in 1996, 1997, 1998, 1999, 2002 and 2004. He won twice, in 1996 and 1998. His 1996 Daytime Emmy win was shared with Jonathan Firstenberg, Robyn Cutler, Michael Licari, Rick Rhodes, John Henry Kreitler, Wes Boatman, Danny Lawrence, John E. Young, David Grant, Barry De Vorzon, Richard Hazard, Edward Dzubak and Alan Bellink.

References

External links
 

Living people
American male composers
21st-century American composers
Emmy Award winners
California State University, Northridge alumni
21st-century American male musicians
Year of birth missing (living people)